Ramsar sites in Northern Ireland are wetlands of international importance designated under the Ramsar Convention. In the United Kingdom, the first Ramsar sites were designated in 1976. Designated and proposed sites in Northern Ireland are listed below:

Ramsar sites in Northern Ireland

See also
 Ramsar Convention
 List of Ramsar sites worldwide

References



 
Northern Ireland
Ramsar sites
Ramsar